
The teaching philosophy of a candidate for an academic position, sometimes referred to as a teaching philosophy statement, is a written statement of the candidate's general personal views on teaching.  Colleges and universities that advertise a position whose duties require teaching often require the applicant to submit a teaching philosophy with the application. Teaching philosophy statements are becoming increasingly required in the attainment of teaching positions. Teaching philosophy statement often attempts to express what methods of teaching the candidate practices and what educational styles they intend to make use of. Teaching philosophy statements are generally reviewed and updated as educators gain more experience to reflect their current views and beliefs.

Content 
The teaching philosophy can cover a substantial amount of material within a single page, which is a common length for the written statement. A writer may include their own teaching experiences or dedication to learning. They may also describe their beliefs around education, including the values they hold and models they intend to follow. Teaching philosophies often share why the individual wishes to teach, and what motivates them to pursue a career in education. Written teaching philosophies may be customized to be more specific to the field one intends to teach.

Study 
Written teaching philosophy statements may be informed by existing pedagogical research and theory; an early example of such a book is The Philosophy of Teaching by Arnold Tompkins. Books, articles, and research on pedagogy can offer a foundation upon which aspiring educators can form their own beliefs and values.

References 

Philosophy of education
Teaching
Education theory